Jesús Rodríguez may refer to:

Academics
Jesús Kumate Rodríguez (1924–2018), Mexican physician and politician
Jesús Ancer Rodríguez (born 1952), Mexican researcher and physician

Artists
Sixto Rodriguez (born 1942), also known as Jesús Rodríguez, American folk musician
Jesús Rodríguez Picó (born 1953), composer and clarinet player
El Koala (Jesus Manuel Rodriguez, born 1970), Spanish musician

Politicians
Jesús Rodríguez Hernández (born 1955), Mexican politician
Jesús Santa Rodríguez (born 1964), Puerto Rican politician
Jesús Márquez Rodríguez, Puerto Rican politician

Sportspeople

Association football
Jesús Rodríguez (Venezuelan footballer) (born 1968), Venezuelan football midfielder
Jesús Rodríguez (Mexican footballer) (born 1993), Mexican football goalkeeper
Jesús Rodríguez (Colombian footballer) (born 1993), Colombian football forward

Other sports
Jesús Rodríguez (weightlifter) (born 1933), Spanish Olympic weightlifter
Jesús Rodríguez Magro (1960–2018), Spanish cyclist
Jesús Rodríguez (athlete), Venezuelan javelin thrower and winner in athletics at the 1962 Central American and Caribbean Games
Jesús Rodríguez (wrestler) (born 1967), Cuban sport wrestler
Ricardo Rodriguez (wrestler) (Jesús Rodríguez, born 1986), Mexican American professional wrestler and ring announcer